Outcry usually refers to a loud cry or a large protest, specifically it can refer to:

 Outcry (mini-series), a 2020 documentary series on a wrongful imprisonment for child sexual assault
 "Outcry" (song), a song by Dream Theater from their album A Dramatic Turn of Events
 Outcry (video game), a first person psychological thriller point-and-click adventure video game 
 Outcry witness, in United States law, the person who first hears an allegation of abuse made by a child or another victim
 Outcry auction or English auction, an open ascending dynamic auction
 Open outcry, a method of communication between professionals on a stock exchange or futures exchange
 The Outcry, a novel by Henry James published in 1911

See also 

 Brouhaha
 Controversy
 Dissent
 Protest
 Scandal